State and official visits to the United Kingdom are formal visits by the head of state of one country to the United Kingdom, during which the British Sovereign acts as official host of the visitor. It is a royal event that involves all the assets in the Civil Service, the Royal Household and the Household Division. It also involves other members of the Royal family and is centred in London, the national capital. Invitations for state visits are sent by the Royal Household with supervision by the Foreign and Commonwealth Office.

State visits do not formally occur between the United Kingdom and the 14 other Commonwealth realms, as the realms all share a common monarch and head of state. Visits conducted by the monarch to another Commonwealth realm are also not considered a state visits but rather royal visits. In addition, official visits to the United Kingdom by another Commonwealth realm are typically performed by their respective governor general, who in that capacity are usually in the country for an audience with the King.

History

One of the more notable as well as earliest instances of a state visit to the British Isles is the Grand Embassy of Peter the Great, which was a diplomatic mission to Western Europe in 1697 and 1698 led by Peter the Great of the Russian Empire. The modern pomp and ceremonial came about in the early 19th century. Examples of this new protocol in action included the Allied sovereigns' visit to England in June 1814. Queen Victoria hosted Napoleon III for a state visit at Windsor Castle in 1855, although it consisted of more informal arrangements. Very few formal state visits to the country did not take place prior to the reign of Queen Elizabeth in the 20th century. One of those few state visits included one by Kaiser Wilhelm II during the reign of his uncle Edward VII in 1907.

Order of events

Arrival
Historically, dignitaries would usually arrive at Gatwick Airport and take the Royal Train to Victoria station. The Queen, typically accompanied by other members of the Royal Family, would greet them here and then lead them by carriage to Buckingham Palace.

Today, most dignitaries arrive at London Heathrow Airport, although there are cases of visitors arriving at London Stansted Airport instead. They are usually greeted on behalf of the Queen by a member of the Royal family and the UK Foreign Secretary.

The dignitary and the monarch then ride down The Mall in a state carriage (usually the 1902 State Landau) escorted by the Household Cavalry with street liners coming from the Foot Guards. Union Flags and the flags of the visiting country are usually draped on both sides of the road.

Arrival ceremony and guard of honour

An arrival ceremony usually takes place on Horse Guards Parade (although there are also some instances where it takes place at Buckingham Palace or Windsor Castle) with a Guard of Honour being provided by members of the King's Guard (usually found from one of the five regiments of foot guards: Grenadier Guards, Coldstream Guards, Scots Guards, Irish Guards, and the Welsh Guards). Prior to a welcoming ceremony at Windsor Castle, the state guest receives a welcome at Datchet railway station with the Household Cavalry Mounted Regiment and its mounted band. Following the performance of the national anthems, first of the visiting country and then God Save the King (although the former is the sole piece that played most of the time), the commander of the guard of honour formation, usually a junior officer, will always report to the dignitary in the language of the visitor, with the report being along the lines of the following:

'"Your Excellency, the guard of honour, provided by the (states name of unit), is formed up, and ready for inspection."After the report, the selected band plays a slow march while the formation of company size is inspected. If the sovereign is present, the State Colour from the regiment's 1st Battalion is dipped during the playing of the anthem.

Depending on the area where the ceremony takes place, a march past will immediately take place following the inspection. If it takes place on Horse Guards Parade, then the foreign guest and the King travel to Buckingham Palace in a carriage procession escorted by a large number of mounted soldiers from the Household Cavalry. The welcome ceremony is accompanied by 21-gun salutes fired from Green Park and the Tower of London. Exceptions to this included Chinese leader Xi Jinping who was received with a 41-gun salute in Green Park and a simultaneous 62-gun salute at the Tower of London and City of London (103 guns in total).

In recent years, Windsor Castle has hosted arrival ceremonies from President Thabo Mbeki of South Africa, King Abdullah II of Jordan, President Barack Obama and Queen Margrethe II of Denmark. During the lattermost visit, the guard of honour was provided by the Princess of Wales's Royal Regiment, a unit of which she is Colonel in Chief. Guards of honour have also been accorded for visiting dignitaries who are in the country on official or even working visits, including Soviet leaders Nikita Khrushchev and Mikhail Gorbachev in 1956 and 1989 respectively as well as US President Donald Trump in 2018. Upon returning home from the latter visit, Trump falsely claimed that the Queen, who accompanied him during his inspection of the 1st Battalion, Coldstream Guards at Windsor Castle, "reviewed her Honor Guard for the first time in 70 years", despite the fact that at the time she had only been sovereign for 65 years. The largest guard of honour to be formed up for a state visit was in 2003 during the visit of President George W. Bush and First Lady Laura Bush, when an arrival ceremony took place in the forecourt of Buckingham Palace, in which the Household Cavalry and the King's Troop were paraded in front of the visiting dignitaries.

Informal events upon meeting the sovereign

Dignitaries have an informal lunch with the King before viewing the Royal Collection's artefacts and exchanging gifts with the Royals.

Government meetings

After all royal meetings are held, the visitor then engages in meetings with leaders in His Majesty's Government, beginning with the Prime Minister of the United Kingdom at 10 Downing Street. In many of these meetings, multi-million pound business agreements are settled upon. Meetings are also held with the Leader of the Opposition, the leaders of all parties represented in the House of Commons, and members of the British Cabinet. In June 1978, Nicolae Ceaușescu made a state visit to the UK where a £200m licensing agreement was signed between the Romanian government and British Aerospace for the production of more than eighty BAC One-Eleven aircraft, which was said to be at the time the biggest civil aircraft agreement between two countries.

Westminster

Speech to Parliament

The visiting head of state, upon the King's request, may also be given the chance to give an address to both chambers of the British Parliament assembled on the halls of the House of Lords in joint session. He/she addresses members of both chambers on the importance of political, military, economic and cultural ties shared by his/her home country with the millions of people of the United Kingdom. The joint speech is presided by the Speaker of the House of Commons in coordination with the Lord Speaker. The first foreign dignitary undertake such a reception was French President Albert Lebrun in March 1939 and most recently was under taken by Willem-Alexander of the Netherlands.

Wreath laying ceremony
Heads of state from over 70 countries have laid wreaths at The Unknown Warrior during state visits.

 State dinner 

 
State dinners are held at Buckingham Palace in London and on occasion at Windsor Castle in Berkshire, should the visitors stay there. Around 150 guests are invited to the white tie event at the ballroom in Buckingham Palace for the banquet, which is an area that has a max capacity of 170 diners. Guests typically members of the Royal Family, members of the visiting delegation, British politicians and notable figures from both countries.  Preparations of the state dinner are the responsibility of the Master of the Household and begin months in advance. The seating chart for the event is confirmed both by the King and the Foreign and Commonwealth Office. During the dinner, honours and decorations of both heads of state are worn and both speeches are checked extensively by the Foreign office.

The preparation of food begins closer to the start of the dinner to ensure the food is still fresh by the time it reaches the table. This also means that every dish is prepared by hand from scratch. The meal spans over four courses that include: fish; main course, pudding and dessert.  Each place setting has six glasses (for water, red and white wine, dessert wine, champagne and port) and up to a dozen pieces of cutlery. The menu is chosen by the King from a choice of four presented by the royal kitchen. Alcoholic drinks come from the Government Wine Cellar, while the food is prepared by chefs of the Royal Household. Large silver-gilt dishes and vessels (both of which are never used during the ceremony) are arranged in tiers on the central table.

Visits to Scotland
They are usually hosted by the either the King or the First Minister of Scotland on this visit. When hosted by the King, the visitor stays at Holyrood Palace. When hosted by the devolved executive government in Scotland, the visitor holds bilateral meetings at St Andrew's House.

During the visit, a speech to the Scottish Parliament is given in the chamber, being broadcast on Parliament TV with the Presiding Officer of the Parliament being the host.

Previous visits to the parliament have included:

April 2018 – President of Malawi Peter Mutharika
June 2016 – Irish President Michael D. Higgins 
March 2016 – Ghanaian President John Mahama 
March 2013 – President of Malawi Joyce Banda 
October 2007 – President of Croatia Stjepan Mesić
January 2007 – President Ólafur Ragnar Grímsson of Iceland
November 2006 – President Lech Kaczyński of Poland
July 2006 – President Valdas Adamkus of Lithuania
July 2006 – President Arnold Rüütel of Estonia
November 2005 – President Bingu wa Mutharika of Malawi
January 2005 – President of Serbia and Montenegro Svetozar Marović 
February 2002 – President Jorge Sampaio of Portugal
June 2001 – President Thabo Mbeki of South Africa
May 2000 – President Bakili Muluzi of Malawi
September 2000 – Ghanaian President Jerry Rawlings

 Number of state visits (since 1952) 

The reigning monarch will usually host one or two states visits per year. Queen Elizabeth II hosted 152 state visits during her time as monarch from 1952 until her death in 2022. King Charles III has so far hosted just 1 state visit, that of South African President Cyril Ramaphosa, since his accession in 2022. 

Controversies

Many controversies have arisen from visits to the United Kingdom, particularly in relation to the human rights record of the visitor:
 1971 – Emperor Hirohito of Japan undertook a state visit to the UK during a time in which anti-Japanese sentiment was rampant, partially due to the emperor's wartime status as head of state. As a result, he was greeted by angry veterans and former British POWs, who notably protested through standing in silence as his open horse-drawn carriage passed through London. Thousands of protesters lined the route to Buckingham Palace, with some turning their back and wearing red gloves to symbolise the British war dead. Others whistled Colonel Bogey by Kenneth J. Alford, which was a popular march during the war. During Hirohito's visit, the satirical magazine Private Eye used a racist double entendre to refer to the emperor's visit ("nasty Nip in the air").
 1978 – It was the first state visit by a Communist head of state to the UK. Despite the Queen's public display of protocol, privately she had thought they had "blood on their hands". As a result, she took steps to avoid meeting the Ceaușescus, with royal author Robert Hardman reporting that: "she decided the best course of action was to hide behind a bush rather than conduct polite conversation". The Queen also received a call from French President Giscard d’Estaing warning her with an account of their recent stay in Paris, during which the Communist Romanian guests had looted their living quarters and had even hacked holes in the walls while searching for bugging devices. The day before Ceaucescu's execution, he was stripped of his honorary GCB (Knight Grand Cross of the Most Honourable Order of the Bath) status and was returned the insignia of the Order of the Star of the Socialist Republic of Romania that Ceaușescu had bestowed upon the Queen during the visit.
 2003 – Protests occurred during the visit of President Vladimir Putin as human rights activists were against Russian involvement in the Second Chechen War. There were also outcries over Russian support for the Iranian nuclear programme. During Putin's visit to Edinburgh, a protester was arrested after he ran in front of the president's motorcade along the Royal Mile.
 2003 – November 2003 marked the state visit of George W. Bush to the UK, during which he was met with anti-war protests in London, attracting 100,000 to 200,000 people. The protests culminated in the toppling of an effigy of Bush in Trafalgar Square. One protester was arrested after attempting to throw an egg at the presidential motorcade. Up to £5 million was reportedly spent on beefing up security for the four-day visit, which included calls for both Bush and Prime Minister Tony Blair to resign over the Iraq conflict.
 2015 – A few days after the state visit by Xi Jinping to the United Kingdom, photographs produced by Amnesty UK showed cargo boxes that revealed "that the Chinese embassy has been shipping in flags, hats, T-shirts and other pro-China merchandise as diplomatic baggage in order to put on a show of strength and support for the visiting President". This was done to counter activists of Falun Gong and the Tibetan independence movement who convened to demonstrate against China's human rights abuses in Tibet Autonomous Region. In May 2016, Queen Elizabeth II was caught in camera making a remark that the Chinese "were very rude to the ambassador" during the visit and that it was "bad luck" for the Metropolitan police commander Lucy D'Orsi to be responsible for security during the event.
 2018 – There were protests during the visit of Saudi Crown Prince Mohammed bin Salman as human rights activists protested war crimes committed during the Saudi Arabian–led intervention in Yemen.

 In popular culture Guarding the Queen'', a documentary published by the BBC, covered the actions of the troops of the Household Division, which included the preparations for the state visit of the President of Ghana John Kufuor in 2007.

See also
 List of state visits received by Elizabeth II
 State visits to the United States
 List of state and official visits by Canada
 United States presidential visits to the United Kingdom and Ireland

References

External links
President Obama Addresses the British Parliament 
President Trump inspects the troops at Buckingham Palace | UK visit
The Royal Family attend a State Banquet at Buckingham Palace of the Spanish State Visit - The Best
UK: WINDSOR CASTLE: DANISH QUEEN'S STATE VISIT
WRAP Bush and Royals arrive for ceremony at Buckingham Palace
video of Trump State Banquet, 2019

Ceremonies in the United Kingdom
Diplomacy
State ritual and ceremonies
Lists of diplomatic visits by heads of state
Diplomatic visits to the United Kingdom
United Kingdom diplomacy-related lists